Atascosa may refer to:
 Atascosa (moth), a genus of moth
 Atascosa County, Texas
 Atascosa, Texas
 Atascosa Mountains in Arizona
 Atascosa River in Texas